In Greek mythology, Euryanassa (Ancient Greek: Εὐρυάνασσα) is a name that may refer to:

Euryanassa, daughter of the river-god Pactolus. She was the wife of Tantalus, and one of the possible mothers of Pelops, Broteas and Niobe.
Euryanassa, daughter of Hyperphas, leader of the Phlegyans and thus, sister to Euryganeia, wife of Oedipus. She was the mother of Minyas by Poseidon.
Euryanassa, a surname of Hebe

Notes

References 
 Lucius Mestrius Plutarchus, Moralia with an English Translation by Frank Cole Babbitt. Cambridge, MA. Harvard University Press. London. William Heinemann Ltd. 1936. Online version at the Perseus Digital Library. Greek text available from the same website.
 Pausanias, Description of Greece with an English Translation by W.H.S. Jones, Litt.D., and H.A. Ormerod, M.A., in 4 Volumes. Cambridge, MA, Harvard University Press; London, William Heinemann Ltd. 1918. . Online version at the Perseus Digital Library
Pausanias, Graeciae Descriptio. 3 vols. Leipzig, Teubner. 1903.  Greek text available at the Perseus Digital Library.

Naiads
Children of Potamoi
Anatolian characters in Greek mythology
Boeotian characters in Greek mythology
Theban mythology